Glenea tenuilineata is a species of beetle in the family Cerambycidae. It was described by Stephan von Breuning in 1956.

Subspecies
 Glenea tenuilineata laterigriseicollis Breuning, 1956
 Glenea tenuilineata tenuilineata Breuning, 1956

References

tenuilineata
Beetles described in 1956